Pelican Publishing Company is a book publisher based in Gretna, a suburb of New Orleans. Formed in 1926, Pelican is the largest independent trade book publisher located in the U.S. South. Pelican publishes approximately 60 titles per year and maintains a backlist of over 2500 books. Most of its titles relate to Louisiana and Southern culture, cuisine, art, travel guides, history, children's books, and textbooks.

History
Formed in 1926 by John McClure, Pelican was tied early in its history to William Faulkner and Stuart O. Landry. In 1970, Dr. Milburn E. Calhoun and family acquired Pelican. Calhoun served as company president and publisher prior to his death in 2012. Since his passing, daughter Kathleen Calhoun Nettleton has occupied his place as publisher and president.

In May 2019, the company's assets was officially purchased by Arcadia Publishing. The purchased titles are now under the Pelican Publishing imprint of Arcadia Publishing. The company itself is still owned by Kathleen Calhoun Nettleton and the retained titles and rights are handled by her firm.

Significant titles
Pelican Publishing Company has produced many noteworthy titles, including the following:

Arnaud's Restaurant Cookbook: Legendary Creole Cuisine by Kit Wohl.
Blood in West Virginia: Brumfield v. McCoy by Brandon Ray Kirk, which tells the story of the Lincoln County Feud.
The Cajun Night Before Christmas by James Rice: A parody of the popular Night Before Christmas poem in which Santa Claus visits Cajun Louisiana.
The Cavalry Battle that Saved the Union: Custer vs. Stuart at Gettysburg, Paul D. Walker, 2002
Clovis Crawfish, a children's series by Mary Alice Fontenot
The Commissioner: A True Story of Deceit, Dishonor, and Death, Bill Keith study of the Shreveport public safety commissioner George W. D'Artois
Finn McCool's Football Club by Stephen Rea, released February 2009. Memoir of the author's experiences at an Irish pub in New Orleans and what happened to the patrons before, during, and after Hurricane Katrina.
Louisiana Almanac (series): A resource of statistical data and historical information related to the State of Louisiana.
The Maverick Guide (series): A series of travel guides begun by Robert W. Bone (author).
New Orleans Classic Cookbook Series featuring Desserts, Appetizers, Seafood and Gumbos & Soups, also by Kit Wohl
See You at the Top, the first book by motivational business speaker Zig Ziglar
Sherwood Anderson and Other Famous Creoles by William Faulkner: The first trade publication written by William Faulkner.

Pelican also has a history of publishing books that advance white supremacist or racist views. It published a number of Stuart Omer Landry's racist tracts, including The Cult of Equality: A Study of the Race Problem and Rebuilding the Tower of Babel: A Study of Christianity and Segregation. 

Pelican has been called "one of the leading, if not the leading, publisher of neo-Confederate books," including books that helped "found the modern neo-Confederate movement." Among the titles it has published are The Southern Nation: The New Rise of the Old South, Myths of American Slavery, and The South Was Right!

References

External links

Pelican Publishing Company

Book publishing companies based in Louisiana
Jefferson Parish, Louisiana
Political book publishing companies
Companies based in New Orleans
Publishing companies established in 1926